Krisztián Simon (born 10 June 1991) is a Hungarian professional footballer who plays for Újpest, as a winger.

Career

Early career
In January 2009, Simon joined Wolverhampton Wanderers' under 18 side from Újpest on loan until May.

Újpest

Having returned to Újpest from Wolverhampton Wanderers in May 2009, Simon played his first match in the Hungarian National Championship I in September 2009 against Zalaegerszegi TE.

In July 2010, he was named best Hungarian under 19 football player of the year by Hungarian Football Association. Across the 2010–11 season he played 1129 minutes and scored two goals.

On 3 July 2012, Simon broke his sole during a training session with Újpest.

On 10 January 2015, Simon refused the offer by Charlton Athletic F.C. In an interview with Nemzeti Sport, he said that the style of Football League Championship did not suit him.

Feyenoord loan
During his first trial game in Feyenoord, on 5 January 2011, Simon significantly contributed to the victory of his team against Sparta Rotterdam in the second half by two assists and a goal. He debuted in the Amsterdam Arena against Ajax Amsterdam in the Eredivisie.

1860 Munich
On 2 February 2015, Simon signed a contract with German 2. Bundesliga club 1860 Munich until 2018. Before 1860 Munich signed Simon, Markus von Ahlen asked former 1860 Munich goalkeeper Gábor Király and former Hertha BSC midfielder and Hungary national football team coach Pál Dárdai's opinion.

Simon gave his debut for the Munich lions on 9 February 2015 in a 1–2 home defeat against Heidenheim, when he was substituted for Maximilian Wittek in the 78th minute.

Simon was left out from the squad due to the fact that he has not acquired the German language correctly and his oversensitivity according to his coach, Torsten Fröhling.

On 13 March 2015, he scored his first goal for the first team of 1860 Munich in a 3–0 away win against Greuther Fürth, when he brought his team to a 1–0 lead in the 34th minute after an assist by Korbinian Vollmann.

International career
Simon played 19 matches and scored 2 goals for the Hungary U-19.

Playing style
Former Újpest and current Feyenoord sport director Leo Beenhakker said that Simon is fast and audacious while playing football in an interview with Nemzeti Sport.

Career statistics

Honours
Újpest
Hungarian Cup (1): 2013–14

References

Living people
1991 births
Footballers from Budapest
Hungarian footballers
Hungary international footballers
Association football forwards
Újpest FC players
Wolverhampton Wanderers F.C. players
Feyenoord players
Nemzeti Bajnokság I players
TSV 1860 Munich players
Eredivisie players
Hungarian expatriate sportspeople in England
Hungarian expatriates in Germany
Hungarian expatriates in the Netherlands